Graham is a census-designated place and unincorporated community in Randolph County, Alabama, United States. Its population was 211 as of the 2010 census.

Demographics

References

Census-designated places in Randolph County, Alabama
Census-designated places in Alabama